The Ballon Generali is a tethered helium balloon, used as tourist attraction and as an air quality awareness tool. Installed in Paris since  1999 in the Parc André-Citroën,  it was created and developed by the French company Aerophile SAS for the celebration of the year 2000.  The balloon has lofted more than 500,000 passengers into the sky since its opening.

Operation 

It has been used as advertising billboard for Fortis, then from 2002 for Eutelsat. In 2008, a partnership has been signed with Banque populaire and Airparif : renamed "ballon Air de Paris", its internal illumination system changes the outer colour in real-time, according to the ambient air pollution in Paris, measured by Airparif : from green (good) to red (bad) through orange (poor).

This system was completed by an independent lighting (panels light-emitting diode, visible especially at night on the lower part of the shell) stating the air quality near traffic with the same colour code.

On April 18, 2013, a brand new tethered helium balloon was introduced, renamed the "Ballon Generali" (the Italian insurance company Generali has entered partnership agreements to more than 14 years with the Mairie de Paris). Since that day, every year it lifts around  visitors. The spectacle lasts around 10 minutes.

See also 

 Aerophile SAS

References

External links 

 web site
 aerophile SA web site

Tourism in France
Balloons (aeronautics)
Buildings and structures in the 15th arrondissement of Paris
Tourist attractions in Paris
Tourism in Paris